Charles L. Adair (21 November 1902 – 2 July 1993) was a rear admiral in the United States Navy during the early-Cold War.

Biography
Born in Texas, his family resettled in California in 1908. Graduating from Annapolis in 1926, Adair attended the Naval Postgraduate School after seven years serving afloat.

References

Further reading

External links

1902 births
1993 deaths
United States Navy personnel of World War II
Burials at the United States Naval Academy Cemetery
Deaths from pneumonia in Maryland
Naval Postgraduate School alumni
People from Tyler, Texas
United States Naval Academy alumni
United States Navy rear admirals
Military personnel from Texas